Sir Joseph Cowen (10 February 1800 – 19 December 1873) was a British Liberal Party politician and manufacturer.

Family
Born in Greenside, County Durham, Cowen was the son of John Cowen. He married Mary Newton, daughter of Anthony Newton, in 1851; they had five children, including Joseph and John.

Early life
Cowen was first apprenticed as a blacksmith in Winlaton, County Durham, at age 19, before later becoming a colliery owner, director of a shipping company, first secretary of the Blacksmiths' Friendly Society, and an original gentleman of the Four & Twenty. He was a coal owner and firebrick and clay retort manufacturer, having inherited the Blaydon Burn from his father, where he joined his brother-in-law. Later, he became a Justice of the Peace for County Durham and an alderman for Newcastle-upon-Tyne.

He was also a life member and chairman of the River Tyne improvement commission, helping make the river navigable for sea-going ships, for which he was knighted on 14 March 1872.

Political career

Cowen demonstrated his political ambition early, protesting the Peterloo Massacre in 1819 and becoming an early member of the Anti-Corn Law League, as well as the National Political Union.

He was elected Liberal MP with radical principles for Newcastle-upon-Tyne at the 1865 general election. While in Parliament, he advocated Church of England disestablishment and game law abolition, shorter parliamentary terms, and redistribution and equalisation of the franchise between counties and boroughs. He also refused to support Irish coercion and aided in the Cobden–Chevalier Treaty with France. He held the seat until his death in 1873, when he was succeeded by his son at the ensuing by-election.

Later life
Cowen died at his home, Stella Hall, Blaydon-on-Tyne, County Durham in 1873. He was buried in St Paul's Churchyard in Winlaton.

References

External links
 

Liberal Party (UK) MPs for English constituencies
UK MPs 1865–1868
UK MPs 1868–1874
1800 births
1873 deaths
People from County Durham (before 1974)
Politicians from Tyne and Wear